Mario Cervi (25 March 1921 – 17 November 2015) was an Italian essayist and journalist.

Born in Crema, Lombardy, Cervi started his career as a journalist in 1945 collaborating with the newspaper  Corriere della Sera as a foreign reporter. In 1965 he debuted as an essayist with Storia della guerra di Grecia ("History of the War of Greece"), with references to his experience as an infantry officer in Greece during the Second World War. After about thirty years of collaboration, in 1974 he left the Corriere della Sera to co-found, with Indro Montanelli, the newspaper il Giornale, in which he was columnist and then also deputy editor.

With Montanelli, Cervi co-wrote 13 volumes of Storia d'Italia and the historical essay Milano ventesimo secolo. After following Montanelli in the short-lived newspaper La Voce in 1994, Cervi collaborated with the newspaper La Nazione and in 1997 he became editor in chief of il Giornale, succeeding to Vittorio Feltri. He left the direction of the newspaper in 2001, still continuing to collaborate as a columnist. He also continued his activity as an essayist, and his last work was the book Sprecopoli, he co-wrote with Nicola Porro in 2007.

References

External links
 Articles written on il Giornale 

1921 births
2015 deaths
People from Crema, Lombardy
20th-century Italian writers
20th-century Italian male writers
21st-century Italian writers
21st-century Italian male writers
Italian essayists
Male essayists
20th-century essayists
21st-century essayists
Italian newspaper editors
Italian male journalists
Italian male non-fiction writers